Autotaxin, also known as ectonucleotide pyrophosphatase/phosphodiesterase family member 2 (E-NPP 2), is an enzyme that in humans is encoded by the ENPP2 gene.

Function 
Autotaxin (ectonucleotide pyrophosphatase/phosphodiesterase 2 (NPP2 or ENPP2) is a secreted enzyme important for generating the lipid signaling molecule lysophosphatidic acid (LPA).  Autotaxin has lysophospholipase D activity that converts lysophosphatidylcholine into LPA.

Autotaxin was originally identified as a tumor cell-motility-stimulating factor; later it was shown to be LPA (which signals through lysophospholipid receptors), the lipid product of the reaction catalyzed by autotaxin, which is responsible for its effects on cell-proliferation.

The protein encoded by this gene functions as a phosphodiesterase. Autotaxin is secreted and further processed to make the biologically active form. Several alternatively spliced transcript variants have been identified. Autotaxin is able to cleave the phosphodiester bond between the α and the β position of triphosphate nucleotides, acting as an ectonucleotide phosphodiesterase producing pyrophosphate, as most members of the ENPP family. Importantly, autotaxin also acts as phospholipase, catalyzing the removal of the head group of various lysolipids. The physiological function of autotaxin is the production of the signalling lipid  lysophosphatidic acid (LPA) in extracellular fluids. LPA evokes growth factor-like responses including stimulation of cell proliferation and chemotaxis. This gene product stimulates the motility of tumor cells, has angiogenic properties, and its expression is up-regulated in several kinds of tumours. Also, autotaxin and LPA are involved in numerous inflammatory-driven diseases such as asthma and arthritis. Physiologically, LPA helps promote wound healing responses to tissue damage. Under normal circumstances, LPA negatively regulates autotaxin transcription, but in the context of wound repair, cytokines induce autotaxin expression to increase overall LPA concentrations.

As a drug target 

Various small molecule inhibitors of autotaxin have been developed for clinical applications. A specific inhibitor against idiopathic pulmonary fibrosis showed promising results in a phase II trial that ended in May 2018. A DNA aptamer inhibitor of Autotaxin has also been described.

Recently, it has been shown that THC is also a partial autotaxin inhibitor, with an apparent IC50 of 407 ± 67 nM for the ATX-gamma isoform. THC was also co-crystallized with autotaxin, deciphering the binding interface of the complex. These results might explain some of the effects of THC on inflammation and neurological diseases, since autotaxin is responsible of LPA generation, a key lipid mediator involved in numerous diseases and physiological processes. However, clinical trials need to be performed in order to assess the importance of ATX inhibition by THC during medicinal cannabis consumption. Development of cannabinoid inspired autotaxin inhibitors could also be an option in the future.

Structure 
The crystal structures rat and mouse autotaxin have been solved. In each case, the apo structure have been solved along with product or inhibitor bound complexes. Both proteins consist of 4 domains, 2 N-terminal somatomedin-B-like (SMB) domains which may be involved in cell-surface localisation. The catalytic domain follows and contains a deep hydrophobic pocket in which the lipid substrate binds. At the C-terminus is the inactive nuclease domain which may function to aid protein stability.

See also 
 Lysophosphatidic acid
 Lysophospholipid receptors
 Lipid signaling
 Phospholipases

References

Further reading

External links
 

EC 3.1.4